Michele Medda (born 7 December 1962) is an Italian comics writer.

Medda was born in Cagliari, Sardinia. In 1991, together with Antonio Serra and Bepi Vigna, he created the science fiction series Nathan Never for Sergio Bonelli Editore. This was followed by Legs Weaver (1995-2005), set in the same fictional universe.

Medda also wrote stories for Tex, Nick Raider and Dylan Dog.

References

External links
Official website

1962 births
Living people
Italian comics writers
People from Cagliari